The 1988 Cheltenham Gold Cup was a horse race which took place at Cheltenham on 17 March 1988. It was the 61st running of the Cheltenham Gold Cup, and was won by Charter Party. The winner was ridden by Richard Dunwoody and trained by David Nicholson. The pre-race favourite Playschool pulled-up before fence 20.

The event was marred by the death of the former winner Forgive 'n Forget, who broke a leg during the race and was euthanised.

Race details
 Sponsor: Tote
 Winner's prize money: £61,960.00
 Going: Soft
 Number of runners: 15
 Winner's time: 6m 58.9s

Full result

* The distances between the horses are shown in lengths or shorter. nk = neck; PU = pulled-up† Trainers are based in Great Britain unless indicated

Winner's details
Further details of the winner, Charter Party:

 Foaled: 1978 in Ireland
 Sire: Document; Dam: Ahoy There (Little Buskins)
 Owner: Claire Smith and Jenny Mould
 Breeder: A. W. Riddell Martin

References
  RacingPost.com
 Party time at the festival for Nicholson, Dunwoody Glasgow Herald, 16 March 1988 (from Google News)

Cheltenham Gold Cup
 1988
1988 in British sport
1980s in Gloucestershire
Cheltenham